Charles John Hall (12 August 1848 – 18 November 1931) was an English cricketer. Hall was a right-handed batsman who bowled right-arm roundarm fast. He was born at Kingston upon Thames, Surrey.

Hall made his first-class debut for Surrey against the Marylebone Cricket Club in 1868 at The Oval. He made seven further first-class appearances for the county, the last of which came against Gloucestershire in 1873. In his eight first-class matches, he scored 71 runs at an average of 5.91, with a high score of 15. With the ball, he took a single wicket (that of the Marylebone Cricket Club's Arthur Becher in 1872).

He died at Heybridge, Essex, on 18 November 1931.

References

External links
Charles Hall at ESPNcricinfo
Charles Hall at CricketArchive

1848 births
1931 deaths
Cricketers from Kingston upon Thames
English cricketers
Surrey cricketers